Water Stories may refer to:

 Water Stories (Cusco album), 1990
 Water Stories (Ketil Bjørnstad album), 1993